Rungruanglek Lukprabat is a Thai Muay Thai fighter.

Biography and career

In 2007 Rungruanglek participated to the annual Isuzu Cup happening at Omnoi Stadium, he was part of the 16 fighters carefully selected for the anniversary of the Isuzu brand. Rungruanglek went undefeated during the group phase and won the Cup defeating Manasak Narupai in the final on June 7, 2008.

Titles and accomplishments
Lumpinee Stadium
 2009 Lumpinee Stadium 118 lbs Champion
Omnoi Stadium
 2008 Omnoi Stadium 118 lbs Champion
 2008 Isuzu Cup Winner
Professional Boxing Association of Thailand (PAT) 
 2006 Thailand 115 lbs Champion
 Thailand 118 lbs Champion
World Combat Games
 2013 World Combat Games Muay Thai -54 kg 
International Federation of Muaythai Associations
 2012 IFMA World Championships -54 kg 
 2014 IFMA World Championships -54 kg 

Awards
 2009 Sports Writers Association of Thailand Fighter of the Year

Fight record

|-  style="background:#fbb;"
| 2012-01-12 || Loss ||align=left| Sam-A Gaiyanghadao || Rajadamnern Stadium || Bangkok, Thailand || Decision || 5 || 3:00

|-  style="background:#fbb;"
| 2011-09-22|| Loss ||align=left| Rungphet Wor Rungniran  || Rajadamnern Stadium || Bangkok, Thailand || Decision ||5 || 3:00

|-  style="background:#fbb;"
| 2011-08-30 || Loss ||align=left| Sam-A Gaiyanghadao || Lumpinee Stadium || Bangkok, Thailand || Decision || 5 || 3:00

|-  style="background:#fbb;"
| 2011-05-10|| Loss ||align=left| Tong Puideenaidee || Lumpinee Stadium || Bangkok, Thailand || Decision || 5 || 3:00
|-
! style=background:white colspan=9 |

|-  style="background:#cfc;"
| 2011-03-31|| Win||align=left| Saeksan Or. Kwanmuang || Rajadamnern Stadium || Bangkok, Thailand || Decision || 5 || 3:00

|-  style="background:#c5d2ea;"
| 2011-02-02|| Draw ||align=left| Tong Puideenaidee || Rajadamnern Stadium || Bangkok, Thailand || Decision || 5 || 3:00

|-  style="background:#cfc;"
| 2010-12-29 || Win ||align=left| Sam-A Gaiyanghadao || Rajadamnern Stadium || Bangkok, Thailand || Decision || 5 || 3:00

|-  style="background:#fbb;"
| 2010-10-05 || Loss ||align=left| Sam-A Gaiyanghadao || Lumpinee Stadium || Bangkok, Thailand || Decision || 5 || 3:00

|-  style="background:#cfc;"
| 2010-06-10|| Win||align=left| Pettawee Sor Kittichai || Rajadamnern Stadium || Bangkok, Thailand || Decision || 5 || 3:00

|-  style="background:#c5d2ea;"
| 2010-05-07|| Draw ||align=left| Pettawee Sor Kittichai || Lumpinee Stadium || Bangkok, Thailand || Decision || 5 || 3:00

|-  style="background:#cfc;"
| 2010-02-23 || Win ||align=left| Prab Gaiyanghadao|| Lumpinee Stadium || Bangkok, Thailand || Decision || 5 || 3:00

|-  style="background:#cfc;"
| 2010-01-08 || Win ||align=left| Lekkla Thanasuranakorn|| Lumpinee Stadium || Bangkok, Thailand || Decision || 5 || 3:00

|-  style="background:#cfc;"
| 2009-12-08 || Win ||align=left| Rungphet Wor.Sangprapai || Lumpinee Stadium || Bangkok, Thailand || Decision || 5 || 3:00
|-
! style=background:white colspan=9 |

|-  style="background:#cfc;"
| 2009-11-13 ||Win ||align=left| Sam-A Gaiyanghadao || Lumpinee Stadium || Bangkok, Thailand || Decision || 5 || 3:00

|-  style="background:#cfc;"
| 2009-09-29 || Win ||align=left| Chatchainoi Sor Prasopchok || Lumpinee Stadium || Bangkok, Thailand || Decision || 5 || 3:00

|-  style="background:#cfc;"
| 2009-09-04 || Win ||align=left| Rungphet Wor.Sangprapai || Lumpinee Stadium || Bangkok, Thailand || Decision || 5 || 3:00

|-  style="background:#fbb;"
| 2009-08-06 || Loss ||align=left| Pakorn Sakyothin || Rajadamnern Stadium || Bangkok, Thailand || Decision || 5 || 3:00

|-  style="background:#cfc;"
| 2009-07-03 ||Win ||align=left| Kaimukdam Sit Or || Lumpinee Stadium || Bangkok, Thailand || Decision || 5 || 3:00

|-  style="background:#fbb;"
| 2009-04-03 || Loss ||align=left| Pornsanae Sitmonchai || Lumpinee Stadium || Bangkok, Thailand || TKO || 2 ||

|-  style="background:#cfc;"
| 2009-03-03 || Win ||align=left| Sam-A Gaiyanghadao || Lumpinee Stadium || Bangkok, Thailand || Decision || 5 || 3:00

|-  style="background:#cfc;"
| 2008-12-08 || Win ||align=left| Wanchalerm Sitsornong || Lumpinee Stadium || Bangkok, Thailand || Decision || 5 || 3:00

|-  style="background:#fbb;"
| 2008-09-04 || Loss ||align=left| Sam-A Gaiyanghadao || Rajadamnern Stadium || Bangkok, Thailand || KO || 4 ||

|-  style="background:#cfc;"
| 2008-06-07 || Win ||align=left| Manasak Pinsinchai || Omnoi Stadium - Isuzu Cup Final || Bangkok, Thailand || Decision || 5 || 3:00
|-
! style=background:white colspan=9 |

|-  style="background:#cfc;"
| 2008-05-17 || Win ||align=left| Songkom Wor.Sangprapai || Omnoi Stadium - Isuzu Cup Semi Final || Bangkok, Thailand || Decision || 5 || 3:00

|-  style="background:#cfc;"
| 2008-03-22 || Win ||align=left| Manasak Pinsinchai || Omnoi Stadium - Isuzu Cup || Bangkok, Thailand || Decision || 5 || 3:00

|-  style="background:#cfc;"
| 2008-01-19 || Win ||align=left| Ole Kor KittisakGym || Omnoi Stadium - Isuzu Cup || Bangkok, Thailand || Decision || 5 || 3:00

|-  style="background:#cfc;"
| 2007-11-24 || Win ||align=left| Kangwalek Petchyindee || Omnoi Stadium - Isuzu Cup || Bangkok, Thailand || Decision || 5 || 3:00

|-  style="background:#cfc;"
| 2007-07-06 ||Win ||align=left| Duangpichit Ajarn Siriporn || Petchyindee + Jor Por Ror 7, Lumpinee Stadium || Bangkok, Thailand || Decision || 5 || 3:00

|-  style="background:#cfc;"
| 2007-05-04 ||Win ||align=left| Rakkiat Kiatpraphat || Petchpiya, Lumpinee Stadium || Bangkok, Thailand || Decision || 5 || 3:00

|-  style="background:#cfc;"
| 2007-02-13 ||Win ||align=left| Detsuriya Sitthiprasert || Petchpiya, Lumpinee Stadium || Bangkok, Thailand || Decision || 5 || 3:00

|-  style="background:#fbb;"
| 2006-12-08 || Loss ||align=left| Deatnarong Sitjaboon || Lumpinee Stadium 50th Anniversary|| Bangkok, Thailand || Decision || 5 || 3:00
|-
! style=background:white colspan=9 |

|-  style="background:#fbb;"
| 2006-10-24 || Loss ||align=left| Kompichit Rifloniasauna  ||Petchyindee, Lumpinee Stadium || Bangkok, Thailand || Decision || 5 || 3:00

|-  style="background:#cfc;"
| 2006-08-18 ||Win ||align=left| Kangwanlek Petchyindee || Petchyindee, Lumpinee Stadium || Bangkok, Thailand || Decision || 5 || 3:00

|-  style="background:#cfc;"
| 2006-07-14 ||Win ||align=left| Kangwanlek Petchyindee || Jor Por Ror 7 + Phetpiya Fights, Lumpinee Stadium || Bangkok, Thailand || Decision || 5 || 3:00

|-  style="background:#cfc;"
| 2006-04-21 ||Win ||align=left| Duangpichit Siriporn || Wanbunya, Lumpinee Stadium || Bangkok, Thailand || Decision || 5 || 3:00

|-  style="background:#cfc;"
| 2006-01-24 ||Win ||align=left| Sam-A Gaiyanghadao || Phetpiya Fights, Lumpinee Stadium || Bangkok, Thailand || Decision || 5 || 3:00

|-  style="background:#fbb;"
| 2005-11-03 || Loss ||align=left| Fahmechai F.A. Group || Rajadamnern Stadium || Bangkok, Thailand || Decision || 5 || 3:00

|-  style="background:#cfc;"
| 2005-10-06 || Win||align=left| Thongchai Tor.Silachai || Rajadamnern Stadium || Bangkok, Thailand || Decision || 5 || 3:00

|-  style="background:#cfc;"
| 2005-07-26 || Win||align=left| Phayasuea Sor.Hengcharoen || Lumpinee Stadium || Bangkok, Thailand || Decision || 5 || 3:00

|-  style="background:#cfc;"
| 2005-06-09 || Win||align=left| Kwanpichit 13CoinsExpress || Rajadamnern Stadium || Bangkok, Thailand || Decision || 5 || 3:00

|-  style="background:#fbb;"
| 2005-02-28 || Loss ||align=left| Songkom Wor.Sangprapai || Rajadamnern Stadium || Bangkok, Thailand || Decision || 5 || 3:00

|-  style="background:#cfc;"
| 2005-01-25 || Win||align=left| Mongkolchai Petchsupan || Lumpinee Stadium || Bangkok, Thailand || Decision || 5 || 3:00

|-  style="background:#fbb;"
| 2004-12-09 || Loss ||align=left| Wannar Kaennorasing || Rajadamnern Stadium || Bangkok, Thailand || Decision || 5 || 3:00

|-  style="background:#fbb;"
| 2004-10-04 || Loss ||align=left| Pornsanae Sitmonchai || Rajadamnern Stadium || Bangkok, Thailand || Decision || 5 || 3:00

|-  style="background:#cfc;"
| 2004-09-16 || Win ||align=left| Aikpracha Meenayothin || Wansongchai Fights, Rajadamnern Stadium || Bangkok, Thailand || Decision || 5 || 3:00

|-  style="background:#cfc;"
| 2004-08-20 ||Win ||align=left| Rittichak Kaewsamrit || Petchsuphan, Lumpinee Stadium || Bangkok, Thailand || Decision || 5 || 3:00

|-  style="background:#cfc;"
| 2004-06-03 || Win ||align=left| Aikpracha Meenayothin || Wansongchai Fights, Rajadamnern Stadium || Bangkok, Thailand || Decision || 5 || 3:00

|-  style="background:#fbb;"
| 2004-04-21 || Loss ||align=left| Petch Banagsaen || Lumpinee Stadium || Bangkok, Thailand ||Decision || 5 || 3:00

|-  style="background:#cfc;"
| 2003-05-03 ||Win ||align=left| Rungrit Sitsomlong ||  || Bangkok, Thailand || Decision || 5 || 3:00

|-  style="background:#cfc;"
| ? ||Win ||align=left| Panomroonglek Kiatmoo9 ||Lumpinee Stadium   || Bangkok, Thailand || KO ||  ||

|-  style="background:#cfc;"
| 2000-12-30 ||Win ||align=left| Panomroonglek Kiatmoo9 || Omnoi Stadium   || Samut Sakhon, Thailand || Decision || 5 || 3:00 
|-
| colspan=9 | Legend:    

|-  style="background:#cfc;"
| 2014-05- || Win ||align=left| Jakhangir Yuldashev || 2014 IFMA World Championships, Final || Langkaw, Malaysia || Decision ||  || 
|-
! style=background:white colspan=9 |
|-  style="background:#cfc;"
| 2014-05- || Win ||align=left| Vladyslav Mykytas  || 2014 IFMA World Championships, Semi Final || Langkaw, Malaysia || Decision ||  || 
|-  style="background:#cfc;"
| 2014-05- || Win ||align=left| Ilyas Mussim  || 2014 IFMA World Championships, Quarter Final || Langkaw, Malaysia || Decision ||  || 
|-  style="background:#cfc;"
| 2014-05- || Win ||align=left| Muhammad Qhalid  || 2014 IFMA World Championships, 1/8 Final || Langkaw, Malaysia || Decision ||  ||

|-  style="background:#cfc;"
| 2013-10-23 || Win ||align=left|  Arslan Bagunov || 2013 World Combat Games, Final || Bangkok, Thailand || Decision ||  || 
|-
! style=background:white colspan=9 |

|-  style="background:#cfc;"
| 2013-10-21 || Win ||align=left|   || 2013 World Combat Games, Semi Final || Bangkok, Thailand || Decision ||  ||

|-  bgcolor="#cfc"
| 2012-09-13 || Win ||align=left| Andrei Zayats|| 2012 IFMA World Championships, Final|| Saint Petersburg, Russia ||  ||  ||
|-
! style=background:white colspan=9 |
|-  bgcolor="#cfc"
| 2012-09-11 || Win ||align=left| Gavrilov Daniil Gennadievich || 2012 IFMA World Championships, Semi Finals|| Saint Petersburg, Russia ||  ||  ||

|-  bgcolor="#cfc"
| 2012-09-09 || Win ||align=left| Hoang Giang|| 2012 IFMA World Championships, Quarter Finals|| Saint Petersburg, Russia ||  ||  ||

|-
| colspan=9 | Legend:

References

Rungruanglek Lukprabat
Living people
1986 births
Rungruanglek Lukprabat
Rungruanglek Lukprabat